Pause may refer to

Technology
 Stop playing audio or video, with the possibility to continue (in the case of video: with a still image)
 The Pause key or symbol
 Found on media players (software, digital, portable), remote controls, cassette decks, VCRs and optical disc players (CD, DVD, Blu-ray)

Computing
 Pause key, the Pause/Break key on computer keyboards
 pause, a DOS command
 The Perl Authors Upload Server (PAUSE), an interface for uploading Perl modules to the Comprehensive Perl Archive Network

Video games
 Pause (video gaming), the option to temporarily suspend play of a video game (first seen in Yar's Revenge 1982)

Arts and entertainment

Film and television
 Pause (2014 film), a 2014 Swiss film
 Pause (2018 film), a Cypriot film
 "Pause" (The Boondocks), a 2010 episode from the third season of The Boondocks

Music
 Rest (music), a musical pause
 Fermata, a musical pause of indefinite duration
 Pause (band), a Thai rock band
 Pause (musician) , American musician and rap artist
 Pause (Four Tet album), 2001
 Pause (P-Model album), 1994
 "Pause" (Run–D.M.C. song), 1990
 "Pause" (Jay Dee song), 2001
 "Pause" (Pitbull song), 2011

Other uses
 Pause (slang), in hip hop culture, a synonym of "no homo"
 Pausa, in linguistics, the end of an utterance

See also
 The Pause (disambiguation)
 Hesitation (disambiguation)